Three French ships of the line of the Ancien Régime have borne the name Soleil Royal ("Royal Sun"), honouring the personal emblem of Louis XIV:
 , present at the Battle of Barfleur
 
 

Furthermore,  was briefly named Soleil Royal before taking her final name.

Sources 
 Les « Soleil Royal » de la marine de l’Ancien Régime, Nicolas Mioque

French Navy ship names